Linda Monia Paulette Sjöström (born 21 December 1973, in Ballingslöv) is a Swedish female dansband singer who has sung with Grönwalls, and was one of the bandmembers who in 1991 formed the band, and in 1992 won the Swedish Dansband Championships contest. She also participated at Melodifestivalen 1997 with the song "Nu i dag", ending up 11th.

In February 1999, she was appointed "best dansband voice of Sweden" in the "Får jag lov". magazine Some months later, she left Grönwalls to start a country music career with the albums "Monia", recorded in the United States, and "Söderns hjärtas ros"., albums who both entered the Swedish album chart.

In mid 2004, she returned to Grönwalls, and in 2006 she was awarded the Guldklaven award in the category "Singer of the year" during the Swedish Dansband Week in Malung.

Solo discography

Albums
2000 – Monia 
2003 – Söderns hjärtas ros

Singles
1997 – Nu i dag / Burnin' For You (released as a Grönwalls single)
2003 – Rakt ut i natten / Den här sortens kärlek (released as a Monia single)

References 

1973 births
Dansband singers
Living people
Swedish country singers
21st-century Swedish singers
21st-century Swedish women singers
Melodifestivalen contestants of 1997